Makram Daboub (born 23 December 1972), is a Tunisian football coach and former player. He was most recently the coach of the Palestinian national team.

References

1972 births
Living people
Tunisian football managers
Palestine national football team managers